Waldie is a surname, and may refer to:

 D. J. Waldie (born 1948), American essayist
 Jerome R. Waldie (1925–2009), American politician
 John Waldie (1833–1907), Canadian politician
 Marc Waldie (born 1955), American volleyball player

See also
Waldie-Griffith baronets